Maryland has an extensive system of state highways, exclusive of the national Interstate and U.S. highway systems, that serves all 23 counties and the independent city of Baltimore, almost every incorporated city, town, and village, and most unincorporated places in the state. These highways are each designated Maryland Route X, where X is a number between 2 and 999. The highways are typically abbreviated MD X, although MD Route X and Route X are used less frequently. Because Maryland does not have a secondary route system or signed county route systems, all state highways are part of the main numerical system. That means the same set of numbers is used for both major highways and minor service roads, and almost every number has been used at one time or another.

The Maryland State Highway Administration constructs and maintains the vast majority of state highways in the 23 counties of Maryland. The Baltimore City Department of Transportation maintains all state highways within the city of Baltimore. Several towns and cities also maintain all or parts of the state highways within their boundaries. There are a few instances where a county department of transportation maintains sections of a state highway. Two unique situations are that MD 200 is maintained by the Maryland Transportation Authority, which controls all of the publicly owned, tolled highways and bridges in the state, and part of MD 295, also known as the Baltimore–Washington Parkway, is maintained by the National Park Service as a National Parkway.

Maryland applies letter suffixes to route numbers as a way of organizing groups of related highways, such as a group of old alignments of a major highway, a group of service roads related to the construction of a major highway, or a combination of both.  However, these letter suffixes are only used for inventory purposes and are never signed, with the exception of MD 835A.  Since most routes with suffixes are very short highways of low importance, these highways are rarely signed with route markers.  However, there are several numbered highways with several disjoint segments whose segments are denoted internally with letter suffixes but the segments are signed with the same numerical route marker; examples of these highways include MD 7, MD 18, MD 144, MD 648, MD 675, and MD 765.

There is no duplication allowed between U.S. and Maryland state highways unless the two highways are related.  The only signed example of duplicate numbers is MD 222, which is the old alignment of US 222 before the latter was rolled back from Perryville to Conowingo.  Duplication of number is allowed between Interstate and Maryland state highways. MD 795 is an unsigned short continuation of I-795. Also, MD 68 intersects I-70 in close proximity to I-68 that signs are posted on I-70 advising drivers of the difference between the roads.

This list of Maryland state highways contains all existing state highways—that is, all highways with Maryland route numbers—and all documented former state highways.

See also

References

External links
MDRoads: State Highways

State highways
Transportation in Maryland